Tom Clare  (born 2 September 1999) is an English footballer and finalist of the ITV 2’s 2023 winter series of Love Island who plays as a forward for Macclesfield F.C. 

Tom met his Partner Sammy on the ITV hit show. Since leaving the Villa he has appeared on the ITV show love island reunion where himself and Sammy visited Macclesfield’s Leasing.com stadium.

Career

Football
Clare came through the academy at Barnsley and joined Bradford City in 2018 but never made an appearance for the first team. He joined Boston United initially on loan from Bradford, before signing a contract with them in June 2019. After a loan spell with Frickley Athletic, Clare left Boston in November 2019. Having spent time at Bradford (Park Avenue), Buxton and Pontefract Collieries, Clare was one of Macclesfield FC's first signings when the club reformed and he signed a contract with the club in June 2021. He was top scorer during Macclesfield’s 2021-22 season with 23 goals and he signed a new 2-year contract in the spring of 2022.

Love Island
Clare was given permission by his club to leave Macclesfield mid-season in January 2023 to appear as a contestant on the ninth series of ITV2 reality television show  Love Island. Macclesfield director of football Robbie Savage reportedly gave his support and advice to Clare about the television appearance.

Honours

Macclesfield
NWCFL Premier Division: 2021–22

References

Living people
1999 births
English footballers
Barnsley F.C. players
Bradford City A.F.C. players
Boston United F.C. players
Frickley Athletic F.C. players
Bradford (Park Avenue) A.F.C. players
Buxton F.C. players
Macclesfield F.C. players
Love Island (2015 TV series) contestants
North West Counties Football League players